Cals or CALS may refer to:

People with the surname
 Jo Cals (1914–1971), Dutch politician, Prime Minister of the Netherlands from 1965 to 1966
 Adolphe-Félix Cals (1810–1880), French portrait and landscape painter

Organizations 
 Central Arkansas Library System
 College of Agriculture and Life Sciences (disambiguation), a number of colleges at different universities

Technology 
 Client access license, a Microsoft license technology
 CALS (DOD) (Continuous Acquisition and Life-cycle Support), a United States Department of Defense initiative for electronically capturing military documentation and linking related information
 CALS Table Model, a standard for representing tables in SGML/XML
 CALS Raster file format, a standard for the interchange of graphics data